Douglas M. North is Head of School of The Albany Academies. He is the former President of Alaska Pacific University and Prescott College.

North is a 1958 graduate of The Albany Academy, and completed undergraduate studies at Yale University. He received an M.A. from Syracuse University and a Ph.D. in English Literature from the University of Virginia.

North led Prescott College from 1989 until 1994, and Alaska Pacific University from 1995 until 2009, where he also served as Professor of Humanities.

References

Alaska Pacific University faculty
Heads of universities and colleges in the United States
Living people
People from Albany, New York
Prescott College
Syracuse University alumni
University of Virginia alumni
Yale University alumni
Year of birth missing (living people)
The Albany Academy alumni